KJSM-LP (97.1 FM) was a radio station broadcasting a religious format, that was licensed to Yucca Valley, California, United States. The station was owned by Joshua Springs Calvary Chapel.

KJSM-LP's license was returned to the Federal Communications Commission (FCC) by the licensee on August 5, 2013, and its license was cancelled by the FCC on August 6, 2013.

References

External links
 Query the FCC's FM station database for KJSM-LP

Defunct radio stations in the United States
JSM-LP
Radio stations disestablished in 2013
Radio stations established in 2005
JSM-LP
2005 establishments in California
2013 disestablishments in California
Defunct religious radio stations in the United States
JSM-LP